Hanna-Urak Waterfall is a waterfall located near Hanna Lake in Urak Valley, Quetta District of Balochistan the province of Pakistan. It is a small waterfall surrounded by mountains.

See also
Urak Valley
List of waterfalls of Pakistan

References 

Waterfalls of Pakistan
Tourist attractions in Balochistan, Pakistan